The Nellis Air Force Base Complex (Nellis AFB complex, NAFB Complex) is the southern Nevada military region of federal facilities and lands, e.g., currently and formerly used for military and associated testing and training such as Atomic Energy Commission atmospheric nuclear detonations of the Cold War. The largest land area of the complex is the Nevada Test and Training Range, and numerous Formerly Used Defense Sites remain federal lands of the complex. Most of the facilities are controlled by the United States Air Force and/or the Bureau of Land Management, and many of the controlling units are based at Creech and Nellis Air Force Bases (e.g., 98th SRSS for NTTR's southern range). Initiated by a 1939 military reconnaissance for a bombing range, federal acquisition began in 1940, and McCarran Field became the World War II training area's 1st of 3 Nevada World War II Army Airfields (cf. Indian Springs & Tonopah) and 10 auxiliary fields. The area's first military unit was initially headquartered in the Las Vegas Federal Building while the WWII Las Vegas Army Airfield buildings were constructed.

Geography
The complex is primarily within the Great Basin physiographic section, and the White River portion east of the Great Basin Divide is in the Colorado River Watershed. Ecology is primarily Tonopah Basin surrounding elevated areas (Foothills/Uplands & High Valleys/Mid-Slope Woodland & Brushland) and 6 Tonopah Playas in Antelope Lake's valley, Cactus Flat, Groom Lake Valley, southern Railroad Valley, Sand Springs Valley, and the northwest NTTR corner. The southern part of the complex in the Mojave Desert ecoregion is mostly Creosote Bush-Dominated Basins and Arid Footslopes (Jackass Flats is in the Amargosa Desert ecoregion.) The complex includes 2 Salt Deserts—in the Coal Valley which has 3 sites of the "ADA activity area" (110E, 110F, & 110G) and in Dry Lake Valley (site 103 along the Burnt Springs Range). The highest ecoregion is in the Tonopah Bombing Range (FUDS) which includes a Central Nevada Bald Mountains ecoregion in the Kawich Range—the southern Bald Mountains are within the NTTR between the TTR & Wildhorse Management Area. The Logistic Supply Area of the ADA activity area is near the only Wetland ecoregion of the Tonopah Basin—in the Pahrangat Valley near both the Mojave ecotone and the northeast corner of the DNWR.

Traversing the complex is the mid-1800s Utah & New Mexico Territories' dividing line (37th parallel north), and the area was used for the 1900–1921 silver rush (e.g., Tonopah Mining District & Tonopah Manhattan Stage Route) The region of mining claims was grouped into numbered geographic areas (e.g., Area 2, Area 5, Area 11, Area 12, Area 25, Area 27, Area 52) which are used for current names, e.g., "Area 3 Compound" and "Groom Lake Field" ("Area 51" colloq.). The 1941-9 demarcation between the Tonopah & Las Vegas Bombing and Gunnery Ranges (Parallel 36°30′ north) is generally along the serpentine Creosote Bush ecotone between the Central Basin and Range ecoregion and "Mojavian flora".

Airspace
 Desert MOA: "subdivided into Sally Corridor, Elgin, Caliente, and Coyote training areas."
 Reveille Airspace: North and South MOA
 Restricted Areas (joint use airspace): R-4806 East/West, R-4809 and R-4807 A/B "subdivided as follows: Alamo A, B, & C, Areas 61, 62B & C, 63, 64A, B, C, & D, 65N, 65S, 71N, 71S, 74A, 74B, 74C, 75E, 75W, 76, 76A, Tolicha, Pahute A & B, ECE, ECW, ECS and Cactus EC."
 "R-4808N and portions of R-4808S are non-joint use restricted areas."
The former Oil Burner/Olive Branch route ("OB-10-Hawthorne") for Strategic Air Command low-level bomber flights scored by the Hawthorne Bomb Plot extended from a "point west of Elko, Nevada, running southwest to Mina, Nevada" at flight level "FL130-140" (the TTR sites for "SAC Targets 1 and 2" are at Antelope Lake.)

Wildlife areas
The Nevada Division of Wildlife's Key Pittman Wildlife Management Area has a NOAA weather station, and Wilderness Areas include the "Worthington Mountains, Weepah Springs, Big Rocks, [and] Ash Springs Wildlife Area". Lands for federal protection of natural resources include:
  Desert National Wildlife Refuge Complex
 Desert National Wildlife Refuge: "established to preserve habitat for the desert bighorn sheep, and is managed by the USFWS as a unit of the Desert National Wildlife Refuge Complex".
 Amargosa Pupfish Station
 Ash Springs Public Rock Art Site: petroglyphs and semi-circular rock alignments south of Ash Springs and managed by the BLM
 Moapa Valley National Wildlife Refuge
 Pahranagat National Wildlife Refuge: migratory bird habitat south of Alamo along U.S. Route 93 in Nevada
 Leviathan Cave Geologic Area:. Leviathon Cave tunnels and chambers for spelunkers and geologists on the east side of the Worthington Mountain Range and administered by the BLM
 White River Narrows Archaeological District: cultural artifacts such as petroglyphs on SR-318 north of Hiko and managed by the BLM
 Railroad Valley Wildlife Management Area
Military operations "when a tortoise is found in harms way" are suspended until it has been removed by an authorized biologist (e.g., dispatched by the Nellis AFB Natural Resources Manager), nesting surveys are conducted prior to military exercises for species protected under the Migratory Bird Treaty Act, and the BLM & USFS provide protections under the Wild Free-Roaming Horse and Burro Act.

History
The original 1940 area named Tonopah Bombing Range was split during WWII and 1 of the 2 subdivisions was named Tonopah Bombing and Gunnery Range in 1947. In 1999 a different area was named a FUDS with the original name--"Tonopah Bombing Range" (J09NV1114)—and the different FUDS J09NV1112 was given a new name --"Tonopah Army Airfield Practice Bombing Ranges"—by 1999.

Notes

Military installations in Nevada
Installations of the United States Air Force in Nevada
Lists of United States military installations
1940 establishments in Nevada